The following is an incomplete list of works in the collection of Jan Gildemeester that are listed by catalog number in the sales catalog prepared by Philippus van der Schley at his estate sale in 1800. The collection of Jan Gildemeester consisted of 300 paintings mentioned in this catalog, but also included several family portraits and the commissioned painting of the gallery itself by Adriaen de Lelie. These were kept back by the family and were later dispersed in various collections.

See also
 The Art Gallery of Jan Gildemeester Jansz

Sources
Catalogus van het kabinet van schilderyen, nagelaaten door den kunstminnaar Jan Gildemeester Jansz. Amsterdam, by Philippus van der Schley, 1800

Gildemeester